Cloncandra Glebe is a townland in County Tyrone, Northern Ireland. It is situated in the historic barony of Omagh East and the civil parish of Kilskeery and covers an area of 213 acres. 

The name derives from the Irish: Cluain Conraidh (Conradh's lawn or meadow).

The population of the townland declined during the 19th century:

See also
List of townlands of County Tyrone

References

Townlands of County Tyrone
Barony of Omagh East